The 2006 Norwegian Football Cup was the 101st edition of the Norwegian annual football knock-out tournament. The tournament started on 10 May and was contested by 128 teams, going through 7 rounds before a winner could be declared. The final match was played on 12 November at Ullevaal Stadium, and marked the end of the 2006 Norwegian football season.

Calendar
Below are the dates for each round as given by the official schedule:

First round 

|colspan="3" style="background-color:#97DEFF"|10 May 2006

|-
|colspan="3" style="background-color:#97DEFF"|11 May 2006

|}

Second round 

|colspan="3" style="background-color:#97DEFF"|7 June 2006

|-
|colspan="3" style="background-color:#97DEFF"|8 June 2006

|}

Third round 
This was the last round in which the Norwegian FA determined match-ups.

|colspan="3" style="background-color:#97DEFF"|5 July 2006

|-
|colspan="3" style="background-color:#97DEFF"|12 July 2006

|}

Fourth round 
From this round onwards, matches were drawn by lots.

|colspan="3" style="background-color:#97DEFF"|19 July 2006

|-
|colspan="3" style="background-color:#97DEFF"|20 July 2006

|}

Quarter-finals

Semi-finals

Final

References
All fixtures, results and matchinfo have been retrieved from this page

 
Norwegian Football Cup seasons
Cup
Norway